Dominic Isaacs (born 13 July 1982 in Cape Town, Western Cape) is a South African association football player who plays as a defender for Ajax Cape Town in the Premier Soccer League.

Isaacs hails from Mitchells Plain on the Cape Flats.

References

1982 births
South African soccer players
Association football defenders
Living people
Cape Town Spurs F.C. players
Sportspeople from Cape Town
Kaizer Chiefs F.C. players
Bloemfontein Celtic F.C. players
Cape Coloureds